A phalanstère (or phalanstery) was a type of building designed for a self-contained utopian community, ideally consisting of 500–2000 people working together for mutual benefit, and developed in the early 19th century by Charles Fourier. Fourier chose the name by combining the French word phalange (phalanx, an emblematic military unit in ancient Greece), with the word monastère (monastery).

Structure
Fourier conceived the phalanstère as an organized building designed to integrate urban and rural features.

The structure of the phalanstère was composed of three parts: a central part and two lateral wings. The central part was designed for quiet activities. It included dining rooms, meeting rooms, libraries and studies. A lateral wing was designed for labour and noisy activities, such as carpentry, hammering and forging. It also hosted children because they were considered noisy while playing. The other wing contained a caravansary, with ballrooms and halls for meetings with outsiders who had to pay a fee to visit and meet the people of the Phalanx community. This income was thought to sustain the autonomous economy of the phalanstère. The phalanstère also included private apartments and many social halls. A social hall was defined by Fourier as a seristère.

In France and the United States
Though Fourier published several journals in Paris, among them Le Phalanstère, he created no phalanstères in Europe due to a lack of financial support.  Several so-called colonies were founded in the United States of America by Albert Brisbane and Horace Greeley.

Examples
La Colonie of Condé-sur-Vesgre (1832)
Phalanstery of Scăieni, Wallachia (1834)
La Réunion in Dallas (1855)
Familistère of Guise (1859)
Familistère of Godin (1887)
Longo Maï Co-operatives (1973)
Uranian Phalanstery (1974)

Gender roles
Fourier believed that the traditional house was a place of exile and oppression of women.  He believed gender roles could progress by shaping them within community, more than by pursuits of sexual freedom or other Simonian concepts.

Legacy
In the 20th century, the architect Le Corbusier adapted the concept of the phalanstère when he designed the Unité d'Habitation, a self-contained commune, at Marseilles.

In 19th century publications
In the Hungarian play The Tragedy of Man,  first published in 1861 by Imre Madách, one of the later scenes takes place in a phalanstery, in a utopian future where the entirety of humanity lives in phalansteries. There are no borders, no nations, and civilization is dominated by science. On the other hand, there is no individuality or creativity, emotions are considered an irregularity and humans are branded with numbers. Four thousand years later, the Sun is dead and Mankind spiritually died along with it in its pursuit of survival.

In Henri Murger's 1851 work Scenes of Bohemian Life, the source of Giacomo Puccini's opera La Bohème and other musical works, Rodolphe meets a young man described as a phalansterian as he is scouring the streets of Paris to borrow five francs in order to entertain a young woman he plans to make his mistress.

The Phalanstères are mentioned several times in Gustave Flaubert's 1869 novel Sentimental Education: for example, among a list of utopian projects: "plans of phalansteria, projects for cantonal bazaars, systems of public felicity."

They are mentioned in William Morris' News from Nowhere, first published in 1890, with the spelling "phalangsteries."

See also 
Feminism in France
Kibbutzim
Oyasato-yakata
Victor Prosper Considerant
Félix Milliet

References

Architecture related to utopias
Feminism in France
Fourierism
Utopian socialism